Isaac George Martin (25 May 1889 – 6 May 1962) was a professional footballer.

Martin, a central defender, began his career with Sunderland and Portsmouth before spending the majority of his career with Norwich City where he made 243 appearances, scoring once.

References

1889 births
1962 deaths
English footballers
Sunderland A.F.C. players
Portsmouth F.C. players
Norwich City F.C. players
Association football central defenders